Elysius conjunctus is a moth of the family Erebidae. It was described by Walter Rothschild in 1910. It is found in Brazil and Venezuela.

References

conjunctus
Moths described in 1910
Moths of South America